Boitumelo Thulo (born April 28, 1990), popularly known as Boity, is a South African television personality, rapper, actress, businesswoman and model. In 2019, Thulo was named as one of Forbes Africa's 30 Under 30 for her contribution in the music and entertainment sector.

She came to spotlight after the release of her debut single "Wuz Dat"  in 2018 featuring Nasty C. In 2020, she signed a record deal with Def Jam Africa and release her EP 4436. The EP was nominated for Best Hip Hop Album at the 27th South African Music Awards.

Early life 
Thulo was born in Potchefstroom, North West, where she was raised by her maternal grandmother. She is the only daughter of Modiehi Thulo, her mother.

Thulo studied psychology and criminology at Monash University, but later dropped out because her mother was unable to pay for her varsity fees. She then signed to a casting agency which resulted in her in appearing on a Wimpy commercial in 2010.

Career

Film and television 
Thulo's television career began when she presented the YOTV educational show "Crib Notes" in 2011. She then was a co-host on the SABC 1 The Media Career Guide Show, which she hosted alongside Thomani Mahlaba. She also served host duties in several television shows, including SkyRoom Live, Ridiculousness Africa, Club 808, Zoned, Change Down, and Big Brother Africa.

In 2012, Thulo starred on the drama series Rockville, which was her first starring role. She appeared for all 4 seasons playing "Mpho Bogatsu".

Thulo's film debut was in 2014 when she starred on a comedy short-film Dear Betty, were she played "Betty". She also was featured in the film Mrs Right Guy (2016) where she played "Marie" which was not a huge role.

In October 2021, Boity received a nomination for African Social Star at 47th People's Choice Awards.

Music 
Thulo made her rapping debut on the Migos Culture Tour in South Africa on 21 October 2017 at TicketPro Dome. As Migos were delayed by a few hours, Thulo joined Nasty C as one of the opening acts until the trio arrived.

On 30 August 2018, Thulo released her debut single "Wuz Dat", featuring Nasty C. The song became the first ever single by a female rapper in South Africa to be certified platinum and this made it the best selling single of all time by a female rapper in that country. It also  won the category of "Best Collaboration" at the 2018 South African Hip Hop Awards, thus making her the first lead female rapper to achieve this.

On 8 February 2019, she released her second single titled "Bakae".

In October 2022, Boity headlined Rose Fest along with Ami Faku, Simmy and Busiswa.
On 4 December 2020, she released the EP 4436, centering mainly on Boity, and containing features from Ricky Rick, and a variety of other artists. The album  was nominated at 27th South African Music Awards as Best Hip Hop album.

In 2021, it was announced that Boity had closed a recording deal with Def Jam Africa. She was the first to mention it on Twitter. On August 19, 2021, she announced  her upcoming single "The yano way" on Instagram. The song will features Daliwonga and Felo.

Other ventures 
In 2016, she collaborated with Sissy-Boy for a jean collection which was predicted to be about "being sexy and celebrating curves". Thulo continued her venture with Sissy-Boy as they released a new collection in July 2018.

In 2018, she partnered with Impulse SA in creating limited edition fragrances. She also graced the cover of Cosmopolitan SA for the September issue.

Business

In 2021 Boity announced the launch of her new beverage alcohol and non-alcohol drinks. The BT signature.

Personal life

Relationships 
Thulo had previously dated rapper Cassper Nyovest and are seen as having an on-again, off-again relationship. The pair got engaged but then they called off their engagement and ended their relationship in December 2015. In October 2021, Thulo was hospitalised after she had a fight  with Bugy Bikwa.

Honours

Forbes Africa 30 Under 30 creatives 
In July 2019, Thulo was named by the Forbes magazine amongst the 30 under 30 creatives category list for her contribution to the music and entertainment sector, the list featured other young African creatives like Nigerian musician Burna Boy, South African actress, TV and radio personality Thando Thabethe, Ghanaian contemporary artist Joseph Awuah-Darko, also known as Okuntakinte and Kenyan film director, producer and screenwriter Njue Kevin.

Filmography

Television

Film

Discography

EPs

Singles

Awards and nominations

References

External links 
 
 

Living people
South African actresses
People from Potchefstroom
1990 births